The Rebels Motorcycle Club is an outlaw motorcycle club. At its peak in Australia, it had around 70 chapters and over 1,000 members and associates nationwide, making it the largest club in the country. It was founded by Clint Jacks in Brisbane, Queensland in 1969 and was originally named the "Confederates". Their insignia is a Confederate flag with a cap-wearing skull and 1% patch in the centre. The Australian government and law enforcement consider the Rebels to be a criminal organisation, but the club claims to be a group of motorcycle enthusiasts rather than gangsters.
After the former National President, Maltese boxer Alex Vella, was stranded in Malta after a visit in 2014, it is presumed that Damien Vella, who was permitted to return to the country, took the role of National President. That being said, his visa was later cancelled and he was sent to Malta.

Its constitution states it is a non-profit organisation which promotes the riding of Harley-Davidson motorcycles. Members are only permitted to join the club once and never to join another motorcycle club.

The Rebels established their first international chapters in New Zealand in 2011.

Criminal activities
In November 2000, police raided Rebels clubhouses in New South Wales, Queensland and Western Australia and seized drugs, firearms and even a crocodile. A number of people were arrested on charges relating to the items seized.

Two Rebel associates were arrested for the murder of Bandidos member Ross Brand after their clubhouse was raided, on 16 November 2008. Brand was shot dead outside the Bandidos clubhouse in Breakwater, Victoria on 22 October.

On 23 April 2009. A series of raids across Australia ended in 27 members of the Rebels being arrested on a number of charges. Drugs including methamphetamine, heroin and cocaine were seized as well as firearms, cash, stolen goods and stolen vehicles.

Edin "Boz" Smajovic, a Bosnian refugee and Rebels member, was shot dead at the Macarthur Auto Centre in Campbelltown, New South Wales. His funeral, which was held on 15 January 2009 at Auburn Gallipoli Mosque, was attended by over 300 Rebels, including National President Alex Vella. He was referred to as their 'little brother'.

On 18 May 2009, Michael Paul Falzon was sentenced to ten years in prison for the trafficking of methamphetamine, which he had been producing in Mackay, Rockhampton and Dalby and used the Rebels to transport and sell it throughout Queensland and South Australia. The drug ring operated from 1999 until 2003 and made at least $1.5 million.

On September 16, 2022, an unnamed Chapter President and 6 associates were arrested in relation to possessing and producing dangerous drugs (methylamphetamine and cannabis), unlawful possession of weapons, possessing explosives and receiving tainted firearm/ammunition property.

Conflict with the Rock Machine

The Rebels began to be involved in a conflict, when a Rock Machine chapter was established in the Perth suburb of Myaree in 2009 by then Rock Machine MC Canada leader Critical J. The Rock Machine had arrived in Australia during 2008. At the time Sean Brown had given permission for a Nomads chapter to be formed. The defection of Rebels MC members to the Rock Machine MC sparked an ongoing violent feud between the groups, when the Rock Machine settled in Perth in 2009 there was allegations by media that a turf war broke out between the two rival motorcycle clubs, with exchanges between the two groups including firebombings, assaults and the assassination attempt in 2011 of Rebels WA president Nick Martin, who survived being shot, tensions remain ongoing.

On 14 April 2012, Anthony Perish (a Gypsy Joker Motorcycle Club member), his brother Andrew (a Rebels Motorcycle Club member) and Matthew Lawton were sentenced to eighteen, nine and fifteen years respectively imprisonment for the homicide of convicted Sydney drug trafficker Terry Falconer, as well as firearms and drug dealing offences.

Overseas expansion
In January 2011 the New Zealand Police announced that the Rebels were attempting to set up a New Zealand chapter, and that this was not welcome. New Zealand has reportedly been deporting Australian Rebels members. Despite this, many members wearing Rebels patches have been spotted throughout the North Island of New Zealand and it is believed they now have a permanent presence in the country.

See also

List of outlaw motorcycle clubs
Criminal Law (Criminal Organisations Disruption) Amendment Act 2013

References

External links
 

Outlaw motorcycle clubs
1969 establishments in Australia
Organizations established in 1969
Motorcycle clubs in Australia
Gangs in Australia
Gangs in New Zealand
Crime in Brisbane
Organisations based in Brisbane